Mastery is a high level of a skill.

Mastery may also refer to:

Mastery (book), a book by Robert Greene
Mastery (horse), a British racehorse

See also
Mastery learning